Aziz Aslam Shaikh (born 15 October 1956 in Rahim Yar Khan, Pakistan) is a member of the  Assembly of the Punjab (district PP-297). He was first elected in 2002 and is a member of the Pakistan People's Party Parliamentarians. He is an agriculturist and businessman with an M.B.A. degree from Dallas Baptist University.

External links
 Punjab Provincial Assembly listing

Living people
1956 births
Punjab MPAs 2002–2007
People from Rahim Yar Khan District
Dallas Baptist University alumni
Pakistan People's Party MPAs (Punjab)